Franklin Olanitori Sasere (born 27 June 1998) is a Nigerian professional footballer who plays as a forward for Vaduz.

Playing career
Sasere made the move from Sunshine Stars to Lugano in September 2019, signing a three-year with the Swiss Super League club.

References

External links
 
 Super League profile

1998 births
Living people
Nigerian footballers
Nigerian expatriate footballers
Association football forwards
Ifeanyi Ubah F.C. players
Sunshine Stars F.C. players
FC Lugano players
Ħamrun Spartans F.C. players
FC Vaduz players
Expatriate footballers in Liechtenstein
Nigeria Professional Football League players
Swiss Super League players
Nigerian expatriate sportspeople in Switzerland
Expatriate footballers in Switzerland
Nigerian expatriate sportspeople in Malta
Expatriate footballers in Malta
People from Ondo City
Nigerian expatriate sportspeople in Liechtenstein